Nektarios Terpos (late 17th century–18th century) was an Orthodox Christian scholar and monk from Moscopole (today in modern Albania) of Aromanian ethnicity. He was the author of an important religious book, called A Handbook called Faith, which was first published in 1732. Terpos, together with Cosmas of Aetolia, was one of the major contributors of religious and cultural revival under the Ottoman rule.

Life
Terpos came from a wealthy family and spend his childhood in Moscopole. He was of Aromanian ethnic background. As a missionary he travelled in Epirus, covering vast areas from Arta to Berat. Terpos will also be remembered for his work in the Ardenica Monastery where in 1731 he wrote a prayer in the form of a fresco. The prayer is in four languages (Albanian, Aromanian, Greek and Latin) and is the first writing in Albanian found in an Eastern Orthodox Church.

Persecuted, Terpo migrated to Italy, where in 1732 he published his main work named A Handbook called Faith. The book was republished 12 times in less than a century (1732–1818). In the book Terpo chastises the Crypto-Christians of Albania, and invites them to never abandon the religion of their forefathers.

References

Aromanian scholars
People from Moscopole
Aromanians from the Ottoman Empire
1675 births
1732 deaths
18th-century Eastern Orthodox Christians
Eastern Orthodox monks